Gilmar Silva Santos  or simply  Gilmar (born March 9, 1984 in Ubatã), is a Brazilian attacking midfielder who currently plays for Itumbiara.

He signed for French team EA Guingamp after a very good 2008/09 season with Náutico. In 2010, Guingamp loaned him to Prudente to play the Brazilian first league.

Club statistics

Honours 
América de Natal
 Campeonato Potiguar: 2015

Santo André
 Campeonato Paulista Série A2: 2016

References

External links

Sportspeople from Bahia
Association football midfielders
Living people
1984 births
Brazilian footballers
Brazilian expatriate footballers
Expatriate footballers in Japan
Expatriate footballers in France
Brazilian expatriate sportspeople in France
Campeonato Brasileiro Série A players
Campeonato Brasileiro Série B players
Campeonato Brasileiro Série C players
Campeonato Brasileiro Série D players
J1 League players
J2 League players
Ligue 2 players
Esporte Clube Vitória players
Santos FC players
Tokyo Verdy players
Yokohama FC players
Clube Náutico Capibaribe players
En Avant Guingamp players
Grêmio Barueri Futebol players
Avaí FC players
Criciúma Esporte Clube players
Oeste Futebol Clube players
ABC Futebol Clube players
América Futebol Clube (RN) players
Esporte Clube Santo André players
Itumbiara Esporte Clube players